Songbei District is one of nine districts of the prefecture-level city of Harbin, the capital of Heilongjiang Province, Northeast China, forming part of the city's urban core. Its name literally means "north of Song", referring to its position north of the Songhua River which runs through the city. It borders the districts of Hulan to the northeast, Daowai to the east, and Daoli to the west, as well as the prefecture-level city of Suihua to the north and west.

Administrative divisions 
Subdistricts: 
Songbei Subdistrict, Songpu Subdistrict, Wanbao Subdistrict, Taiyangdao Subdistrict,  Song'an Subdistrict, Songxiang Subdistrict, Chuankou Subdistrict

Town:
Duiqingshan

Former : Sandian Subdistrict, Leye Town

See also 
Harbin hotel fire

References

External links
  Government site - 

Songbei